Maximiliano R. Ramírez (born October 11, 1984) is a Venezuelan former professional baseball catcher. He played in Major League Baseball (MLB) for numerous teams.

Career

Atlanta Braves
In 2002 Ramírez was signed as an international undrafted free agent by the Atlanta Braves.

Cleveland Indians
In 2006, Ramírez was traded by the Braves to the Cleveland Indians for Bob Wickman.

Texas Rangers
In 2007, he was traded by Cleveland to the Texas Rangers for Kenny Lofton. Ramírez made his Rangers debut on June 22, .

After the 2008 season ended, Ramírez played in the Venezuelan Winter League for the La Guaira Sharks. In 50 games, he batted .298 with 15 home runs, 53 RBI, and 42 runs scored en route to winning the Rookie of the Year Award over fellow catcher Pablo Sandoval.

Following the 2009 season Ramírez traded to the Boston Red Sox for Mike Lowell, but the trade was canceled because of Lowell's torn thumb ligament.

Going into the 2010 MLB season Ramírez was rated as the Rangers 11th best prospect by Baseball America.

Chicago Cubs
After the Texas Rangers signed Arthur Rhodes on January 4, 2011, Ramirez was placed on waivers to clear a spot on the 40 man roster. The Boston Red Sox claimed him on January 5. He was claimed off waivers again on January 10, this time by the Chicago Cubs. Ramirez was released on May 6.

Houston Astros
Ramirez signed a minor league contract with the Houston Astros on May 10, and was optioned to Triple-A Oklahoma City RedHawks. He was released on June 16.

San Francisco Giants
On June 21, Ramirez signed a minor league contract with the San Francisco Giants.

Kansas City Royals
Ramírez signed a minor league contract with the Kansas City Royals on December 13, 2011. He posted a .300/.374/.473 batting line with 17 homers and 77 RBIs for the Triple-A Omaha Storm Chasers in 2012, but failed to earn a Major League callup.

On October 18, 2012, Ramírez re-signed with the Royals on a minor league deal for the 2013 season.

Cincinnati Reds
The Cincinnati Reds signed Ramirez to a minor league deal on November 8, 2013. On May 22, 2014, Ramirez was released by the Reds.

Second stint with the Royals
On May 27, 2014, Ramirez signed a minor league deal to return to the Royals. He was assigned to the Double-A Northwest Arkansas Naturals.

Broncos de Reynosa
On April 1, 2016, Ramirez signed with the Broncos de Reynosa of the Mexican Baseball League.

Toros de Tijuana
On May 18, 2016, Ramirez was traded to the Toros de Tijuana. He was released on June 13, 2016.

Sugar Land Skeeters
On April 19, 2017, Ramirez signed with the Sugar Land Skeeters of the Atlantic League of Professional Baseball.

Saraperos de Saltillo
On April 21, 2017, Ramirez signed with the Saraperos de Saltillo of the Mexican Baseball League. He was released on February 24, 2018.

Tecolotes de los Dos Laredos
On May 1, 2018, Ramirez signed with the Tecolotes de los Dos Laredos of the Mexican Baseball League. He was released on May 15, 2018.

See also
 List of Major League Baseball players from Venezuela

References

External links

Official Bio

1984 births
Living people
Arizona League Rangers players
Bakersfield Blaze players
Bravos de Margarita players
Broncos de Reynosa players
Danville Braves players
Fresno Grizzlies players
Frisco RoughRiders players
Gulf Coast Braves players
Iowa Cubs players
Kinston Indians players
Lake County Captains players
Louisville Bats players
Major League Baseball catchers
Major League Baseball players from Venezuela
Mayos de Navojoa players
Mexican League baseball first basemen
Northwest Arkansas Naturals players
Oklahoma City RedHawks players
Oklahoma RedHawks players
Olmecas de Tabasco players
Omaha Storm Chasers players
Sportspeople from Barquisimeto
Rome Braves players
Sugar Land Skeeters players
Sultanes de Monterrey players
Tecolotes de los Dos Laredos players
Texas Rangers players
Tiburones de La Guaira players
Toros de Tijuana players
Venezuelan expatriate baseball players in Mexico
Venezuelan expatriate baseball players in the United States
World Baseball Classic players of Venezuela
Yaquis de Obregón players
2009 World Baseball Classic players